Aaron H. Devor (born 1951), is a Canadian sociologist and sexologist known for researching transsexuality and transgender communities. Devor has taught at the University of Victoria since 1989 and is the former dean of graduate studies.  Devor is the current Research Chair in Transgender Studies at the University of Victoria, and the Founder & Academic Director of The Transgender Archives at the University of Victoria Libraries.  Maclean's, a Canadian weekly news magazine, described Devor as "an internationally respected expert on gender, sex and sexuality."

Early life and education
Devor earned a bachelor's degree in psychology from York University in 1971, a master's degree in communications from Simon Fraser University in 1985, and a Ph.D. in sociology from the University of Washington in 1990. A trans man, Devor transitioned in 2002 at age 51.

Career
Devor was a member of the HBIGDA task force which created the sixth and seventh edition of The Standards of Care.  Currently, he sits as a committee member for the eighth edition and is the Chairperson of the Archives Committee.  He has collected first-person narratives of transsexual experiences and has done extensive biographical research on trans man Reed Erickson.

Devor's book, The Transgender Archives: Foundations for the Future, was a finalist for the Lambda Literary Award in the non-fiction category in 2015.

In 2016, through her Foundation, Jennifer Pritzker gave a $2 million donation to create the world's first academic chair of transgender studies, at the University of Victoria in British Columbia; Devor was chosen as the inaugural chair.

Selected publications
Devor, H (1989). Gender Blending: Confronting the Limits of Duality. Indiana University Press,  *889
Devor, H (1994). Transsexualism, Dissociation, and Child Abuse An Initial Discussion Based on Nonclinical Data. Journal of Psychology & Human Sexuality Volume: 6 Issue: 3
Devor, H (1997). FTM: Female-to-Male Transsexuals in Society. Indiana University Press, Second Edition (2016) 
Devor, A. H, & Matte, N (2004). "ONE Inc. and Reed Erickson: The Uneasy Collaboration of Gay and Trans Activism, 1964-2003." GLQ: A Journal of Gay and Lesbian Studies, 10(2), 179–209.

Devor, A. & Wilson, M. (Eds.) (2019). "Glimmerings: Trans Elders Tell Their Stories". Transgender Publishings,

References

External links
Aaron H. Devor Page of the University of Victoria Website

1951 births
Living people
Canadian sociologists
Academic staff of the University of Victoria
Canadian LGBT rights activists
Transgender men
Canadian transgender writers
Transgender studies academics
York University alumni
Simon Fraser University alumni
University of Washington College of Arts and Sciences alumni
Transgender academics
20th-century social scientists
21st-century social scientists
Canadian sexologists
21st-century Canadian LGBT people
Canadian LGBT academics